The Eagles–Steelers rivalry is a National Football League (NFL) rivalry between the Philadelphia Eagles and the Pittsburgh Steelers. Unofficially nicknamed "The Battle of Pennsylvania", this is an in-state, interconference rivalry between the two NFL teams located in the state of Pennsylvania.

The rivalry is one of the oldest in the NFL, dating back to 1933. During the first three decades of the rivalry, the Steelers and Eagles were in the NFL's Eastern Division and played twice annually. As a result of the AFL-NFL merger, the Steelers were placed in the AFC Central, while the Eagles were placed in the NFC East, resulting in infrequent meetings – The teams have only met 12 times since 1970. Under the current NFL scheduling formula, the teams play each other at least once every four years, when the AFC North and NFC East play one another. However, with a new 17-game schedule being introduced in 2021, it is now possible for the two teams to meet as often as every other year, depending on division placement.

The rivalry is one of two the Steelers have with NFC East teams, the other being their rivalry with the Dallas Cowboys.  Much like other rivalries between Philadelphia and Pittsburgh, the rivalry is mostly fueled by the two cities being within Pennsylvania and their sociocultural differences, with Philadelphia and the neighboring Lehigh Valley and Wyoming Valley being part of the Northeast megalopolis while Pittsburgh and Western Pennsylvania in general being part of the Rust Belt and Appalachia. Central Pennsylvania is considered battleground territory between the two teams.

The Eagles lead the all-time series 48–29–3. The teams have met once in the playoffs, a 21–0 Eagles victory in the 1947 Eastern Division Playoff. As the two teams are in different conferences, the only way they can currently meet in the playoffs is if they both make it to the Super Bowl.

History

Early years
Both teams were officially founded in 1933, with the Steelers then being known as the Pittsburgh Pirates. However, their histories predate that, with the Steelers being known as the J.P. Rooneys dating to 1921 as a semipro team, while the Eagles are arguably descended from the Frankford Yellow Jackets based in Philadelphia's Frankford neighborhood dating to 1899. The NFL considers both teams having started in 1933 alongside the now-defunct Cincinnati Reds. Both teams took advantage of Pennsylvania relaxing their blue laws in 1933 that previously didn't allow sporting events on Sundays, when most NFL games took place. The blue laws, combined with general issues related to The Great Depression, were among the reasons the Yellow Jackets failed despite winning the NFL champsionship in 1926.

The first meeting between the teams was on November 19, with the Eagles winning, 25–6. The two teams would struggle their first decade in the NFL both on the field and financially, with the Steelers staying afloat mostly due to team founder Art Rooney's gambling habits. Eventually, in late 1940 Rooney sold the Steelers to Alexis Thompson, a 26-year-old steel heir from Boston frequently described in the press as "a well-heeled New York City playboy". Thompson planned to move the franchise to Boston and play games in Fenway Park. Eagles owner Bert Bell brokered the deal between Rooney and Thompson for $160,000, and Rooney used $80,000 of the proceeds to buy a partnership in the Eagles, which at the time was owned by Bell. The deal also involved the trade of several players between the two teams.

The two owners planned to field a combined Philadelphia-Pittsburgh team called the Pennsylvania Keystoners that would play home games in both cities. The original proposition was that Thompson would buy the franchise and take the Pittsburgh club to Boston and Bell and Rooney would pool their interests in the Eagles to form a Philadelphia-Pittsburgh club, splitting the home games between Forbes Field in Pittsburgh and Philadelphia's Municipal Stadium.  Thompson, however, was unable to secure a place to play in Boston.  After meeting with Rooney, plans changed whereby Thompson's club (ostensibly the former Steelers) would play in Philadelphia as the Eagles, while the Rooney-Bell owned team would play in Pittsburgh as the Steelers, effectively trading the two clubs between their cities.

Steagles and post-war activity

The notion for a single team between the two cities was revived, when for one season in 1943, forced to do so by player shortfalls brought on by World War II, the two clubs temporarily merged as the Philadelphia-Pittsburgh "Steagles".  The league only approved the merger for one year; Pittsburgh was willing to merge again for 1944 but not Philadelphia. This forced the Steelers to merge with the Chicago Cardinals (as Card-Pitt) for 1944.

Following the end of the war, both teams fortunes changed, with the Eagles and Steelers both clinching playoff spots in the late 1940s, including their only postseason meeting to date in 1947, when the Eagles shut out the Steelers 21–0 at Forbes Field. It would be the Steelers only playoff appearance until the Immaculate Reception 25 years later. The Eagles, under head coach Greasy Neale, won NFL championships in 1948 and 1949.

During the 1950s and 1960s, both teams success and failures would be relative to one another, to the point that both teams would be "competing" for the worst record in the NFL in 1968 and the chance to draft O. J. Simpson. Ultimately, the Atlanta Falcons had the NFL's worst record and the Buffalo Bills of the American Football League would win out on what was at that point the common draft. The Eagles, drafting third, would select Leroy Keyes while the Steelers, drafting fourth, would draft relative unknown Joe Greene. New Steelers head coach Chuck Noll would say later that the team would've drafted Greene even if it had the first overall pick, while Keyes (like Simpson a running back) was viewed by Eagles fans as more of a "consolation prize". Ultimately (Simpson's successful NFL career aside), Keyes lasted five years in the NFL; Greene would become a key member of the Steel Curtain defense and is now a member of the Pro Football Hall of Fame and one of two Steelers to have their number officially retired.

Results 

|-
| 
| style="| 
| style="| Eagles  25–6
| no game
| Eagles  1–0
| 
|-
| 
|Tie 1–1
| style="| Pirates  9–7
| style="| Eagles  17–0
| Eagles  2–1
| 
|-
| 
|Tie 1–1
| style="| Pirates  17–7
| style="| Eagles  17–6
| Eagles  3–2
| 
|-
| 
| style="| 
| style="| Pirates  6–0
| style="| Pirates  17–0
| Pirates  4–3
| Eagles move to John F. Kennedy Stadium (then known as Philadelphia Municipal Stadium).
|-
| rowspan="2"| 
| rowspan="2" style="| 
| rowspan="2"| no games
| style="| Pirates  27–14
| rowspan="2"| Pirates  6–3
| 
|-
| style="| Pirates  16–7
|-
| 
| style="| 
| style="| Eagles  14–7
| style="| Eagles  27–7
| Pirates  6–5
| 
|-
| 
| Tie 1–1
| style="| Eagles  17–14
| style="| Pirates  24–12
| Pirates  7–6
| 
|-

|-
| 
| Tie 1–1
| style="| Eagles  7–0
| style="| Steelers  7–3
| Steelers  8–7
| Eagles move to Connie Mack Stadium.
|-
| 
| style="| 
| Tie  7–7
| style="| Eagles  10–7
| Tie  8–8–1
| 
|-
| 
| Tie 1–1
| style="| Steelers  14–0
| style="| Eagles  24–14
| Tie  9–9–1
| 
|-
| 
| style="| 
| style="| Eagles  30–6
| style="| Eagles  45–3
| Eagles  11–9–1
| Eagles and Steelers did not meet head-to-head in 1943 and 1944 due to both teams losing players to World War II. The Steelers merged with the Eagles temporarily in 1943 as the "Steagles", and were temporarily merged with the Chicago Cardinals and were known as "Card-Pitt" in 1944, and were not scheduled to meet.
|-
| 
| Tie 1–1
| style="| Eagles  10–7
| style="| Steelers  10–7
| Eagles  12–10–1
| 
|-
| 
| Tie 1–1
| style="| Eagles  21–0
| style="| Steelers  35–24
| Eagles  13–11–1
| Eagles lose 1947 NFL Championship.
|-
! 1947 playoffs
! style="| 
! 
! style="| Eagles  21–0
! Eagles  14–11–1
! 1947 Eastern Division Playoff. Only postseason meeting. First postseason game for both franchises.
|-
| 
| style="| 
| style="| Eagles  17–0
| style="| Eagles  34–7
| Eagles  16–11–1
| Eagles win 1948 NFL Championship.
|-
| 
| style="| 
| style="| Eagles  34–17
| style="| Eagles  38–7
| Eagles  18–11–1
| Eagles win 1949 NFL Championship.
|-

|-
| 
| Tie 1–1
| style="| Steelers  9–7
| style="| Eagles  17–10
| Eagles  19–12–1
| Eagles win seven straight meetings.
|-
| 
| Tie 1–1
| style="| Steelers  17–13
| style="| Eagles  34–13
| Eagles  20–13–1
| 
|-
| 
| style="| 
| style="| Eagles  26–21
| style="| Eagles  31–25
| Eagles  22–13–1
| 
|-
| 
| style="| 
| style="| Eagles  23–7
| style="| Eagles  35–7
| Eagles  24–13–1
| Eagles win seven straight road meetings.
|-
| 
| Tie 1–1
| style="| Eagles  24–22
| style="| Steelers  17–7
| Eagles  25–14–1
| 
|-
| 
| Tie 1–1
| style="| Eagles  24–0
| style="| Steelers  13–7
| Eagles  26–15–1
| 
|-
| 
| style="| 
| style="| Eagles  14–7
| style="| Eagles  35–21
| Eagles  28–15–1
| 
|-
| 
| Tie 1–1
| style="| Eagles  7–6
| style="| Steelers  6–0
| Eagles  29–16–1
| 
|-
| 
| style="| 
| style="| Steelers  26–24
| style="| Steelers  23–7
| Eagles  29–18–1
| Eagles move to Franklin Field. Steelers first season sweep over the Eagles since 1937.
|-
| 
| Tie 1–1
| style="| Eagles  28–24
| style="| Steelers  31–0
| Eagles  30–19–1
| 
|-

|-
| 
| Tie 1–1
| style="| Eagles  34–7
| style="| Steelers  27–21
| Eagles  31–20–1
| Eagles win 1960 NFL Championship.
|-
| 
| style="| 
| style="| Eagles  21–16
| style="| Eagles  35–24
| Eagles  33–20–1
| 
|-
| 
| style="| 
| style="| Steelers  26–17
| style="| Steelers  13–7
| Eagles  33–22–1
| 
|-
| 
| Tie 0–0–2
| Tie  21–21
| Tie  20–20
| Eagles  33–22–3
| 
|-
| 
| style="| 
| style="| Eagles  21–7
| style="| Eagles  34–10
| Eagles  35–22–3
| 
|-
| 
| Tie 1–1
| style="| Steelers  20–14
| style="| Eagles  47–13
| Eagles  36–23–3
| Steelers' last victory to date in Philadelphia.
|-
| 
| style="| 
| style="| Eagles  27–23
| style="| Eagles  31–14
| Eagles  38–23–3
| Last season in which both teams met twice annually.
|-
| 
| style="| 
| style="| Eagles  34–24
| no game
| Eagles  39–23–3
| 
|-
| 
| style="| 
| no game
| style="| Steelers  6–3
| Eagles  39–24–3
| 
|-
| 
| style="| 
| style="| Eagles  34–24
| no game
| Eagles  40–24–3  
| 
|-

|-
| 
| style="| Eagles  30–20
| Franklin Field
| Eagles  41–24–3
| 
|-
| 
| style="| Steelers  27–0
| Three Rivers Stadium
| Eagles  41–25–3
| Steelers win Super Bowl IX.
|-
| 
| style="| Eagles  17–14
| Veterans Stadium
| Eagles  42–25–3
| Eagles end Steelers' 12 game winning streak dating back to the previous season. Steelers win Super Bowl XIV.
|-

|-
| 
| style="| Eagles  27–26
| Three Rivers Stadium
| Eagles  43–25–3
| 
|-

|-
| 
| style="| Eagles  23–14
| Veterans Stadium
| Eagles  44–25–3
| 
|-
| 
| style="| Steelers  14–3
| Three Rivers Stadium
| Eagles  44–26–3
| 
|-
| 
| style="| Eagles  23–20
| Veterans Stadium
| Eagles  45–26–3
| 
|-

|-
| 
| style="| Eagles  
| Three Rivers Stadium
| Eagles  46–26–3
| First meeting to be decided in overtime. Eagles rally from a 10-point deficit in the final 2:36, which included the Eagles recovering an onside kick to drive for the game-tying field goal at the end of regulation, and the game-winning field goal during the first possession of overtime.
|-
| 
| style="| Steelers  27–3
| Heinz Field
| Eagles  46–27–3
| Steelers hand the Eagles their first loss of the season after starting 7–0. Eagles lose Super Bowl XXXIX, while the Steelers lose AFC Championship Game preventing an all-Pennsylvania Super Bowl.
|-
| 
| style="| Eagles  15–6
| Lincoln Financial Field
| Eagles  47–27–3
| Steelers win Super Bowl XLIII, while Eagles lose NFC Championship Game, preventing an all-Pennsylvania Super Bowl.
|-

|-
| 
| style="| Steelers  16–14
| Heinz Field
| Eagles  47–28–3
| 
|-
| 
| style="| Eagles  34–3
| Lincoln Financial Field
| Eagles  48–28–3
| 
|-

|-
| 
| style="| Steelers  38–29
| Heinz Field
| Eagles  48–29–3
| 
|-
| 
| style="| Eagles  35–13
| Lincoln Financial Field
| Eagles  49–29–3
| Eagles have won ten straight home meetings (1966–present). Eagles lose Super Bowl LVII.
|-

|-
| Regular season
| style="| Eagles 48–29–3
| Eagles 29–9–2
| Steelers 20–19–1
|
|-
| Postseason
| style="| Eagles 1–0
| no games
| Eagles 1–0
| 1947 Eastern Division Playoff
|-
| Regular and postseason 
| style="| Eagles 49–29–3
| Eagles 29–9–2
| Tie 20–20–1
| 
|-

See also
 National Football League rivalries
 Flyers–Penguins rivalry
 Phillies–Pirates rivalry

References

Pittsburgh Steelers
Philadelphia Eagles
National Football League rivalries
Pittsburgh Steelers rivalries
Philadelphia Eagles rivalries